Rogov and Rogova (feminine) is a common Russian and Jewish surname.

People with this surname include:

 Aleksandr Rogov (1956–2004), Soviet flatwater canoer
 Aleksandr Rogov (footballer) (born 1986), Russian footballer
 Aleksey Rogov (born 1991), Russian footballer
 Daniel Rogov (1935–2011), Israeli food and wine critic
 Evgeni Rogov (1929–1996), Russian footballer
 Igor Rogov (born 1950), Kazakhstani politician
 Maksim Rogov (born 1986), Russian footballer
 Nikolai Rogov (1825–1905), Russian ethnographer and philologist
 Sergey Rogov (born 1948), Russian political scientist

See also
Rogoff

Russian-language surnames